The Revolutionary People's Party may refer to:

 Revolutionary People's Party (Turkey, illegal), DHP
 Revolutionary People's Party (Turkey, legal), DEV-PARTİ